The name Teodoro is the Italian, Portuguese and Spanish form of Theodore.

People

Given name
 Teodoro Alcalde (1913–1995)
 Teodoro Ardemans (died 1726)
 Teodoro Borlongan (1955–2005)
 Teodoro Buontempo (1946–2013)
 Teodoro Cano García (born 1932)
 Teodoro Celli (1917–1989), music critic
  (born 1996), actor
 Teodoro Correr (1750–1830)
 Teodoro Cottrau (1827–1879)
 Teodoro Cuñado (born 1970)
 Teodoro de Croix (1730–1792)
 Teodoro Fernandes Sampaio (1855–1937), Brazilian engineer, geographer and historiographer
 Teodoro Fernández (1913–1996)
 Teodoro García Simental (born 1974)
 Teodoro Ghisi (1536–1601)
 Teodoro Goliardi (born 1927)
 Teodoro Kalaw (1884–1940)
 Teodoro Kalaw (sport shooter)
 Teodoro Lechi (1778–1866)
 Teodoro Locsin Jr. (born 1948)
 Teodoro Lonfernini (born 1976)
 Teodoro Maniaci
 Teodoro Matos Santana (1946–2013)
 Teodoro Mauri (1904–1960)
 Teodoro Moscoso (1932–1992)
 Teodoro Obiang Nguema Mbasogo (born 1942), president of Equatorial Guinea
 Teodoro Nguema Obiang Mangue (born 1968), Vice President of Equatorial Guinea and son of the President of Equatorial Guinea
 Teodoro Orozco (born 1963)
 Teodoro Palacios (born 1939)
 Teodoro Paredes (born 1993)
 Teodoro Petkoff (1932–2018)
 Teodoro Plata (1866–1897)
 Teodoro R. Yangco (1861–1939)
 Teodoro Ribera
 Teodoro Sandiko (1860–1939)
 Teodoro Schwartz (1893–1968)
 Teodoro Vega (born 1976)

Surname
 Gilbert Teodoro (born 1964)
 John Iremil Teodoro (born 1973)
 Lourdes Teodoro (born 1946)
 Lucimar Teodoro (born 1981)
 Manuel Teodoro (born 1963)
 Marcelino Teodoro (born 1970)
 Zé Teodoro (born 1963)

Characters 
 Teodoro (Prison Break character), Theodore "T-Bag" Bagwell

See also
 San Teodoro (disambiguation)
 Teodoro Sampaio (disambiguation)

Italian masculine given names
Portuguese masculine given names
Spanish masculine given names